M Innas Ali (September 1, 1916May 3, 2010) was a Bangladeshi physicist. He was the founding chairman of Bangladesh Atomic Energy Commission. He was selected National Professor of Bangladesh in 1994.

Education
Ali completed his M.Sc. in Physics from University of Dhaka in 1940. Later he earned M.E.E. from New York University and Ph.D. in nuclear physics from London University in 1948 and 1955 respectively.

Career
Ali served as the president of Bangladesh Academy of Sciences and vice chancellor of University of Chittagong.

Awards
 Independence Day Award for Science and Technology (1991)

References

External links
 An undying soul dedicated to science

1916 births
2010 deaths
University of Dhaka alumni
Academic staff of the University of Dhaka
Bangladeshi physicists
National Professors of Bangladesh
Recipients of the Independence Day Award
Burials at Banani Graveyard
Fellows of Bangladesh Academy of Sciences
Vice-Chancellors of the University of Chittagong
Honorary Fellows of Bangla Academy
People from Netrokona District
Pakistani expatriates in the United States
Pakistani expatriates in the United Kingdom